Aaron Cel (born March 4, 1987) is a French-Polish professional basketball player for Polski Cukier Toruń of the Polish Basketball League.

Professional career
Cel made his professional debut with Le Mans in the French Pro A League. He later played with Brest, Boulazac and Nantes in the French Pro B League. In the summer of 2011, he signed with Polish team Turów Zgorzelec. After he spent two seasons with them in June 2013, he signed with Stelmet Zielona Góra. In July 2015, he returned to France and signed with AS Monaco Basket. For the 2016–17 season he moved to French club BCM Gravelines. On August 6, 2017, he signed with Polish club Polski Cukier Toruń.

National team career
Cel represented the French national basketball team at junior level. He later acquired Polish citizenship and started to play for the Polish national basketball team. With Poland he played at the EuroBasket 2015.

References

External links

Aaron Cel at eurobasket.com
Aaron Cel at euroleague.net
Aaron Cel at fiba.com
Aaron Cel at lnb.fr 
Aaron Cel at plk.pl 

1987 births
Living people
2019 FIBA Basketball World Cup players
AS Monaco Basket players
Basket Zielona Góra players
BCM Gravelines players
Boulazac Basket Dordogne players
Étendard de Brest players
French men's basketball players
Hermine Nantes Basket players
Le Mans Sarthe Basket players
Polish expatriate basketball people in France
Polish expatriate sportspeople in Monaco
Polish men's basketball players
Power forwards (basketball)
Sportspeople from Orléans
Turów Zgorzelec players
Twarde Pierniki Toruń players
Polish people of French descent
Citizens of Poland through descent